The Hong Kong Open (currently sponsored by Prudential and called the Prudential Hong Kong Tennis Open) is a professional tennis tournament in Hong Kong SAR. Organised by the Hong Kong Tennis Association, the tournament is held annually in early October in Victoria Park, Causeway Bay on the WTA International tier.

The Hong Kong Tennis Open was previously named the Salem Open that began in 1973 and discontinued in 2002. The current tournament resumed in September 2014 in Hong Kong.

History

The Hong Kong Open (also known as the Salem Open) was also previously a men's tennis tournament that was held in Hong Kong on the Grand Prix tour from (1973–1987) and the ATP Tour from (1990–2002). Players competed in the Victoria Park Tennis Centre, on outdoor hard courts. Michael Chang held the record number of wins with three titles.

In 2001, as with legislation restricting tobacco sponsorship, organisers controversially altered its official logo to include the logo of Perrier, causing anti-smoking campaigners to claim that the organisers exploited a loophole in its sponsorship clause.

The men's tournament was replaced in 2003 by the Thailand Open.

A women's competition was also held in Hong Kong from 1980 to 1982; and then once more in 1993, as a Tier IV event on the WTA Tour. Wendy Turnbull won two titles in this competition. Starting from 2014, the Hong Kong Tennis Open was again held as a WTA International event and has attracted many top players since.

In July 2014, it was announced that Prudential Hong Kong would become the tournament's title sponsor to mark the return of elite women's professional tennis to Hong Kong after two decades.  The Prudential Hong Kong Tennis Open 2014 took place at the Victoria Park Tennis Stadium from 8–14 September. Among the competitors were women's doubles pair Peng Shuai and Hsieh Su-wei and Wimbledon finalist Sabine Lisicki.

In 2018, the tournament was awarded the WTA International Tournament of the Year.

The 2019 Hong Kong Open was canceled due to 2019–20 Hong Kong protests.

The 2020 and 2021 Hong Kong Open were canceled due to coronavirus epidemic. Amid public concern for the personal freedom of Chinese tennis player Peng Shuai after her accusation of sexual assault by Communist Party officials, all WTA events in China, including Hong Kong were suspended until further notice.

Results

Women's singles

Women's doubles

Men's singles

Men's doubles

See also
 Hong Kong National Grass Court Championships
 Hong Kong National Hardcourt Championships
 Hong Kong National Tennis Championships

References

External links
 
 WTA tournament profile

 
ATP Tour
Grand Prix tennis circuit
Hard court tennis tournaments
WTA Tour
Defunct tennis tournaments in Hong Kong
Recurring sporting events established in 1973
Recurring sporting events disestablished in 2002
1973 establishments in Hong Kong
2002 disestablishments in Hong Kong
Defunct sports competitions in Hong Kong